Cynan ap Hywel (ruled 999–1005) was a Prince of Gwynedd, one of the kingdoms or principalities of medieval Wales. He was the son of Hywel ap Ieuaf, a previous king from the line of Idwal Foel (his grandfather). On Hywel's death, the realm was ruled by his brother, but almost immediately was seized by Maredudd ab Owain.

After the death in 999 of Maredudd, the rule of Gwynedd returned to the original dynasty in the form of Cynan ap Hywel. Cynan reigned until 1005 but very little has been recorded about his reign, and nothing is known about the circumstances in which he was supplanted by Aeddan ap Blegywryd, who was apparently out of the direct line of succession.

See also
History of Wales

References

Cynan ap Hywel, Prince of Gwynedd
Monarchs of Gwynedd
11th-century Welsh monarchs
10th-century Welsh monarchs
Year of birth unknown